Chile competed at the 1968 Summer Olympics in Mexico City, Mexico. 21 competitors, 19 men and 2 women, took part in 19 events in 4 sports.

Athletics

Boxing

Men's Middleweight (– 75 kg)
 Miguel Villugron
 First Round — Lost to Jan van Ispelen (HOL), TKO-2

Equestrian

Shooting

Four shooters, all men, represented Chile in 1968.

Trap
 Juan Enrique Lira
 Pedro Estay

Skeet
 Nicolas Atalah
 Jorge Jottar

References

External links
Official Olympic Reports

Nations at the 1968 Summer Olympics
1968
1968 in Chilean sport